The Midwest Collegiate Hockey Association tournament was a Division III college ice hockey tournament held annually to determine the MCHA champion. The tournament operated from the inception of the conference in 1999 to its absorption by the NCHA in 2013.

History
The MCHA tournament was held every year that the MCHA existed and was discontinued when the NCHA absorbed the MCHA. Originally the tournament was an entirely single-elimination format, but after the league expanded to 6 teams in 2004–05, each round was changed to point system; two teams would play two games against one another with the first to three points being declared the winner (two points for a win, one point for a tie). After two games, if both teams remained tied, a 20-minute mini-game was played to determine which team would advance. In accordance with NCAA rules, mini-games did not count for a team's standings or statistics and were only used to decide which team progressed.

1999

Note: * denotes overtime period(s)

2000

Note: * denotes overtime period(s)

2001

Note: * denotes overtime period(s)

2002

Note: * denotes overtime period(s)

2003

Note: * denotes overtime period(s)

2004

Note: As the top seed, Marian served as host for the entire tournament.

Note: * denotes overtime period(s)

2005

Note: * denotes overtime period(s)Mini games in italics

2006

Note: Lawrence served as host for the entire tournament.

Note: * denotes overtime period(s)

2007

Note: Finlandia served as host for the Semifinal and Championship rounds.

Note: * denotes overtime period(s)

2008

Note: MSOE served as host for the Semifinal and Championship rounds.

Note: * denotes overtime period(s)

2009

Note: Adrian served as host for the Semifinal and Championship rounds.

Note: * denotes overtime period(s)

2010

Note: Adrian served as host for the Semifinal and Championship rounds.

Note: * denotes overtime period(s)Mini games in italics

2011

Note: Adrian served as host for the Semifinal and Championship rounds.

Note: * denotes overtime period(s)Mini games in italics

2012

Note: Adrian served as host for the Semifinal and Championship rounds.

Note: * denotes overtime period(s)Mini games in italics

2013

Note: Adrian served as host for the Semifinal and Championship rounds.

Note: * denotes overtime period(s)Mini games in italics

See also
NCHA Men's Tournament

References

Ice hockey
Midwest Collegiate Hockey Association
Recurring sporting events established in 1999
Recurring sporting events disestablished in 2013